The Papists Act 1722 (9 Geo. I, c. 24) was an Act of the Parliament of Great Britain, enacted after the discovery of the Jacobite Atterbury Plot. The Act required landowners to take the oaths of allegiance, supremacy, and abjuration, by 25 December 1723; those who declined were to register their estates by 25 March 1724 (N.S)/1723 (O.S).

If they failed to do so they risked forfeiting their estates. It was repealed by the Papists Act 1723 (10 Geo. 1, c. 4).

Notes

Great Britain Acts of Parliament 1722
History of Christianity in the United Kingdom
1722 in Christianity
Law about religion in the United Kingdom